Blockade is the prevention of troops and supplies from reaching an opposing army.

Blockade may also refer to:

 Blockade (board game), a strategy game by Lakeside
 Blockade (novel), written by Derek Hansen
 Blockade (solitaire), a type of solitaire card game
 Blockade (video game), video game
 Blockade (1928 film), a film by George B. Seitz
 Blockade (1938 film), a film by William Dieterle starring Henry Fonda
 Blockade (2006 film), a documentary film by Sergei Loznitsa
 Blockade (2016 film), a documentary film by Arif Yousuf
 Blockade (Stargate Universe), an episode of the television series Stargate Universe

See also
 
 
 The Big Blockade, 1940 British wartime propaganda film
 Blockade Billy, 2010 novel by Stephen King
 Coulomb blockade, in physics
 Operation: Blockade, 2002 video game
 Procaine blockade, medical treatment
 Block (disambiguation)